Gazoline is a Canadian rock band from Chicoutimi, Quebec (now Saguenay, Quebec). Its music is a mix of new wave, pop, and punk rock.

Biography

First album 
Created from the ashes of Chicoutimi band Les Horn Abbots, led by Xavier Thériault and JC Tellier, Gazoline officially exists since 2012, with the release of the EP Futurbabymama. Working with Quebec punk rock icon Xavier Cafeïne as a producer, the musicians got significant media attention with this first production, taking them to the second place of the famous francophone contest Francouvertes 2012. After several noteworthy appearances in all major festivals in Quebec, Gazoline released its first full-length album Gazoline in March 2014, on the record label L-Abe. This new album threw the band in front of the French Canadian music scene, gaining a prized nomination in the category "Rock Album of the Year" at the 2014 ADISQ Gala as well as "Emerging french artist of the year" at the Sirius XM Awards of 2013.

Radio hit singles like Ces gens qui dansent and Du feu helped Gazoline reach a bigger audience, being featured in Quebecois prime-time shows such as Hockey Night in Canada, Tout le monde en parle, La Voix, Belle et bum and more.

Brûlensemble 
The young musicians returned to the recording studio to finish their second album, Brûlensemble, after a significant Canadian tour that included more than 300 performances. Recruiting new member and long time friend Marc-André Landry on keyboards, the recent 4-piece act also saw David Dufour quitting music and being replaced by Jean-Philippe Godbout (Noem, Trio Jonathan Turgeon, TRSTSS).

Clearly distinct from the sounds of their first album, Brûlensemble showcases a somewhat less juvenile approach, mixing new wave and 80's influences in the punk rock roots of Gazoline. The aid of famed composer Julien Mineau (Malajube, Fontarabie) as producer surely helped finding this new direction. "Brûlensemble" was nominated at the ADISQ Gala in 2017 in the Rock Album of the Year Category, as well as for the SOCAN Songwriting Prize.

Gazoline III 
The band took a surprising turn in 2017, exactly one year after "Brûlensemble", with the release of "Yūgen", a five songs EP with a heavy electro synth pop feel.

After a hiatus up to 2021, which saw the creation of lead singer Xavier Dufour-Thériault's solo project Zoo Baby, Gazoline announced a comeback with Gazoline III, produced by Gus van Go.

Discography 
 2012 - Futurbabymama - EP (Ambiances Ambiguës)
 2014 - Gazoline (L-A be let artists be / Ambiances Ambiguës)
 2015 - Je cherche (Ambiances Ambiguës) (Single)
 2016 - Brûlensemble (L-A be / Ambiances Ambiguës)
 2017 - Yūgen (Duprince)
2021 - Gazoline III (Duprince)

References 

Musical groups established in 2012
Musical groups from Quebec
Canadian rock music groups
Saguenay, Quebec
2012 establishments in Quebec